Govt. Madrasah-e-Alia is a government madrasa located in Bakshibazar, Dhaka, Bangladesh. Since its founding the madrasah has been playing a significant role in imparting and spreading Islamic education and ideology that is conservative, methodical, modern and progressive.

History
Alia Madrasah was established in 1780 by British government and formed Madrasah education Board of Bengal. Madrasah Education was then started formally. Consequently, Madrasah Education was reformed. To materialize this declaration of share-E-Bangla a committee named Moula Box was formed. This committee, along with the advice of establishing a University for Madrasah students, advises in the following way for the entire development of Madrasah Education. In 1947 after having the independence of Pakistan many commissions was formed for the development of Madrasah Education. Among them in 1949 “West Bengal Educational System Reconstruction Committee” and in 1963-64 the name of Arabic University are especially mentionable.

On 4 April 2005, activists of Islami Chhatra Shibir and Jatiyatabadi Chhatra Dal over a stolen phone. Jatiyatabadi Chhatra Dal stated that they would not Shibir to establish "supremacy" in the madrasa.

On 14 April 2011, students of the madrasa clashed with staff of Dhaka Education Board over a road accident between a car and a rickshaw. Ten students of the Madrasa were injured and 5 detained by Bangladesh Police.

Notable staff
Abdur Rahim
Ayub Ali
Amimul Ehsan Barkati
Ubaidul Haq
Abdur Rahman Kashgari
Deen Muhammad Khan
Zafar Ahmad Usmani

Notable alumni
Khandaker Abdullah Jahangir, former professor at Islamic University, Bangladesh
Muhiuddin Khan, translator of the Quran
Muhammad Qudrat-i-Khuda, founder of the Council of Scientific and Industrial Research
Motiur Rahman Nizami, former leader of Bangladesh Jamaat-e-Islami
Saifur Rahman Nizami, recipient of the Ekushey Padak
Abdul Qayum, British scholar
Habibur Rahman, politician
AKM Yusuf, Hadith scholar and politician
Kamaluddin Zafree, founder of Bangladesh Islami University
Abubakar Muhammad Zakaria, professor at Islamic University, Bangladesh

See also
 Qawmi
 Education in Bangladesh
 Al-Haiatul Ulya Lil-Jamiatil Qawmia Bangladesh
 Bangladesh Qawmi Madrasah Education Board
 Bangladesh Madrasah Education Board

References

Further reading
 

Education Board in Bangladesh
Universities and colleges in Bangladesh
Alia madrasas of Bangladesh